Lygrocharis nigripennis is a species of beetle in the family Cerambycidae.
It was first described by Dario mendes.

Notes

References

Rhinotragini
Beetles described in 1938